Pieter Gerald Bartholomeusz Keuneman (3 October 1917 – 3 January 1997) was a Sri Lankan politician and a Marxist. He was the Cabinet Minister of Housing and Local Government and prominent Member of Parliament and a leading figure in the Communist Party of Sri Lanka (CPSL)

Early life and education
Pieter Keuneman came from a Dutch Burgher family. He was born to Hon. Justice Arthur Eric Keuneman, a distinguished judge of the Supreme Court, and Majorie Eleanor Schokman, daughter of a wealthy medical doctor from Kandy, George Peter Schokman, M.B., C.M. (Aber.), Provincial Surgeon, Ceylon Medical Department.

Keuneman was educated at the Royal College, Colombo where he was the head of the junior cadet platoon, prefect, captain of the debating team and president of the literary association. He won college colours at rugger and won the Dornhorst Memorial Prize and the Shakespeare prize. He went on to Pembroke College, Cambridge, in 1935 where he became a communist, President of the Cambridge Union and editor of the student magazine Granta. He gained a BA Tripos in History, Sociology and English Literature and joined the Gray's Inn to study law, leaving without taking his bar examinations. Later he gained a MA from Cambridge.

While at Cambridge he worked briefly for the Daily Express, before leaving for Spain to fight against Francisco Franco in the Spanish Civil War. At Cambridge he met his first wife, Hedi Stadlen, who became one of the leading European Radicals in Sri Lanka.

Political career
On returning to Ceylon he worked as a features editor at Lake House. He was an architect of the United Socialist Party which was formed in 1940. He was its secretary and after it was proscribed by Admiral Geoffrey Layton, the Communist Party of Ceylon was formed at 'Cotta' Road in 1943. He became a member of the National Congress in 1945. During the 1940s he was the Secretary of the Communist Party and launched the journal Forward of which he was the editor in 1944. Even though he contested and lost elections for the Colombo Municipal Council in 1943, he won the Kotahena ward in 1947 holding it until 1959. In that capacity he agitated for better housing, eradication of slums and shanties in the Colombo city and saw to the setting up of libraries and dispensaries.

He contested the first parliamentary elections in 1947 from the Colombo Central constituency and was returned as the third member of parliament obtaining 15,435 votes. On his proposal in June 1948 for a Bribery Commission, the first Bribery and Corruption Commission was formed chaired by his father Justice A.E. Keuneman. In the 1952 elections, he was elected as the first MP for Colombo Central electorate defeating the labour party leader A.E. Goonesinghe and retained his seat in the 1956, 1960 and 1970 elections. He was very critical of the 1962 coup d'état attempt and the 1971 JVP Insurrection.

In 1970, in the government of Sirimavo Bandaranaike, he held the portfolio of Housing and Construction as a Cabinet Minister. The establishment of the State Engineering Corporation and many housing schemes was his brainchild. He introduced a controversial floor area limit of 300 square metres on all new private houses. However he lost his seat in the 1977 election and retired from politics.

Family
He married his first wife Hedi Stadlen after graduating from Cambridge. In 1952 he married his second wife Maud Rogerson a communist activist. His third wife was Ouida Keuneman, with whom he lived out his days.

See also
 Communist Party of Sri Lanka

References

External links
 Pioneer of Left and Socialist Movement in Sri Lanka
 Official Website of Lanka Sama Samaja Party (LSSP)
   Amara Samra
   Pieter Keuneman in Sinhala
 Royal College honours old Royalists in Parliament

1917 births
1997 deaths
Alumni of Pembroke College, Cambridge
Alumni of Royal College, Colombo
Burgher journalists
Burgher politicians
Colombo municipal councillors
Communist Party of Sri Lanka politicians
Foreign volunteers in the Spanish Civil War
Housing ministers of Sri Lanka
Lanka Sama Samaja Party politicians
Members of Gray's Inn
Members of the 1st Parliament of Ceylon
Members of the 2nd Parliament of Ceylon
Members of the 3rd Parliament of Ceylon
Members of the 4th Parliament of Ceylon
Members of the 5th Parliament of Ceylon
Members of the 6th Parliament of Ceylon
Members of the 7th Parliament of Ceylon
People from British Ceylon
Presidents of the Cambridge Union
Sri Lankan people of Dutch descent
Sri Lankan Roman Catholics